Listeria grandensis is a species of bacteria. It is a Gram-positive, facultatively anaerobic, non-motile, non-spore-forming bacillus. It is non-pathongenic and non-hemolytic. The species was discovered in and named after Grand County, Colorado, and its discovery was first published in 2014.

Listeria grandensis is phenotypically similar to Listeria cornellensis, but L. grandensis shows temperature-dependent acidification of L-rhamnose.

References

External links
Type strain of Listeria grandensis at BacDive -  the Bacterial Diversity Metadatabase

grandensis
Bacteria described in 2014